Michelle Jones may refer to:

 Michelle Jones (Brookside)
 MJ (Marvel Cinematic Universe), full name Michelle Jones-Watson
 Michelle Jones (actress) in Corazón valiente
 Michele S. Jones, United States Army Reserve officer